Dwarka, Dwaraka or Dvaraka may refer to:

Places

India 
 Dvārakā, ancient city in Gujarat, the capital of the Yadus in the Mahabharata
 Dvārakā–Kamboja route, an ancient trade-route and a branch of the Silk Road
 Dwarka, Gujarat, also known as Dvaraka
 Dwarka (Vidhan Sabha constituency of Gujarat), an assembly constituency of Gujarat
 Dwarkadhish Temple, a Hindu temple dedicated to the god Krishna
 Dvaraka Pitha, a monastery in Gujarat
 Devbhumi Dwarka district, a district of Gujarat
 Dwarka River, a tributary of the Bhagirathi
 Bet Dwarka, an island near the city of Dvaraka (Gujarat)
 Dwarka, Delhi, Sub City of Delhi, also known as Dvaraka
 Dwarka (Delhi Assembly constituency), an assembly constituency of Delhi
 Dwarka Baoli, a stepwell in Delhi
 Dwaraka Nagar, a locality in Visakhapatnam
 Dwaraka Nagar, Kadapa, a village in Andhra Pradesh
 Dwaraka Tirumala, a town in Andhra Pradesh
 Dwaraka Tirumala mandal, a tehsil in Andhra Pradesh
 Venkateswara Temple, Dwaraka Tirumala, a vaishnavite temple

Other 
 Derweze, Turkmenistan, also known as Dvaraka
 Dvaravati, Thailand, also known as Dvaraka

Transport

Delhi Metro 
Dwarka metro station
Dwarka Mor metro station
Dwarka Sector 8 metro station
Dwarka Sector 9 metro station
Dwarka Sector 10 metro station
Dwarka Sector 11 metro station
Dwarka Sector 12 metro station
Dwarka Sector 13 metro station
Dwarka Sector 14 metro station
Dwarka Sector 21 metro station

Other 
Dwarka Express, an express train of the Indian Railways
Puri Okha Dwarka Express, an express Train of the Indian Railways 
Dwarka railway station, a railway station in Gujarat
Dwaraka bus station, a bus station complex in Visakhapatnam
Jamnagar & Dwaraka Railway, metre gauge railway in Gujarat during 19th century
SS Dwarka, a passenger/cargo ship of British India Steam Navigation Company

People 
Dwarka Divecha, an Indian cinematographer and actor
Dwarka Nath Das, an Indian politician from Assam
Dwarka Nath Mitra, an Indian lawyer and judge of the Calcutta High Court
Dwarka Nath Tiwary, an Indian politician from Bihar
Dwarka Prasad Mishra, an Indian politician; chief minister of Madhya Pradesh
Dwarkanath Kotnis, Indian physician during the Second Sino-Japanese War
Dwarkanath Tagore, Indian industrialist and founder of the Jorasanko branch of the Tagore family

Entertainment 
 Dwaraka (film), a 2017 Telugu film

Other uses 
 Operation Dwarka, a naval operation by the Pakistan Navy
 INS Dwarka, a forward operating base of the Indian Navy

See also